St. Lupus from Novae (Sfântul Lup in Romanian) is a Dacian or Roman saint who was for a while the servant of St. Demetrius from Thessaloniki.
He is celebrated on August 23. Lupus lived in Novae, a Roman fortress in the Danube valley, today the Bulgarian town Svishtov. He was contemporary with Roman Christian martyrs Montanus and Anastasia from Sirmium

Life
St. Lupus lived at the end of the 3rd century and beginning of the 4th century, and was a faithful servant of the holy Great Martyr Demetrius of Thessaloniki (October 26). Lupus was present at the death of his master, and he soaked his own clothing with his blood and took a ring from his hand. With these objects St Lupus worked many miracles at Thessaloniki. He attacked pagan idols, for which he was subjected to persecution by the pagans, but he was preserved unharmed by the power of God.
St Lupus voluntarily delivered himself into the hands of the torturers, and by order of the Emperor Galerius, he was beheaded by the sword on August 23, shortly after St. Demetrius death (probably in 307).

Novae
The old legion fortress of Novae turned into a Roman-Byzantine town in the 5th – 6th century . The ruins of the Bishop's complex date back to those times. The ruins consist of a large basilica, residential houses with impressive baths, and a large building, which was designated for receiving the pilgrims to the local martyr St. Lupus. A baptistery impressive with its architecture was found west from the basilica entrance. It was an extension to the church in which Christianization was performed.

Peter, the brother of the Emperor Mauricius (582-602) passed with his army through Novae at the end of the 6th century during his campaign in Dacian territories. A chronicle described the visit of Peter and the celebrations of St. Lupus day in Novae.

References

4th-century Christian martyrs
People executed by decapitation